The  Baltimore Colts season was the sixth season for the team in the National Football League. The Colts finished the 1958 season with a record of 9 wins and 3 losses to win their first Western Conference title. They won their first league title in the NFL championship game, which ended in overtime with a touchdown by fullback Alan Ameche.

Regular season

Schedule

Season summary

Week 1

Week 2

Week 3

Source: Pro-Football-Reference.com

Standings

Postseason 
The 1958 NFL Championship Game was 26th annual NFL championship game, played on December 28 at Yankee Stadium in The Bronx, New York City. The Colts beat the Giants 23–17 in overtime, earning their first ever championship, and the game became known as The Greatest Game Ever Played.

Roster

See also 
History of the Indianapolis Colts
Indianapolis Colts seasons
Colts-Patriots rivalry

References 

Baltimore Colts
Baltimore Colts seasons
National Football League championship seasons
Baltimore Colt